Nanula flindersi, common name Flinders top shell, is a species of minute sea snail, a marine gastropod mollusk or micromollusk in the family Trochidae, the top snails

Description
The height of the shell attains 4 mm.

Distribution
This marine species is endemic to Australia and occurs in the shallow subtidal zone and the continental shelf off South Australia, Victoria and Western Australia.

References

 Cotton, B.C. & Godfrey, F.K. 1935. South Australian Shells. Part 15. South Australian Naturalist 16(3): 34–41 
 Cotton, B.C. 1959. South Australian Mollusca. Archaeogastropoda. Handbook of the Flora and Fauna of South Australia. Adelaide : South Australian Government Printer 449 pp
 Wilson, B. 1993. Australian Marine Shells. Prosobranch Gastropods. Kallaroo, Western Australia : Odyssey Publishing Vol. 1 408 pp

flindersi
Gastropods of Australia
Gastropods described in 1935